Montvalezan is a commune in the Savoie department in the Auvergne-Rhône-Alpes region in south-eastern France. In 2018, it had a population of 701. 
Montvalezan is best known for containing La Rosière ski resort. It is located in the Tarentaise Valley, on the road of Little St Bernard Pass.

See also
Communes of the Savoie department

References

Communes of Savoie